St. Benedict Catholic Secondary School may refer to:

St. Benedict Catholic Secondary School (Cambridge)
St. Benedict Catholic Secondary School (Sudbury)